Victoria Ann Powers is an American mathematician specializing in algebraic geometry and known for her work on positive polynomials and on the mathematics of electoral systems. She is a professor in the department of mathematics at Emory University.

She is the author of the book Certificates of Positivity for Real Polynomials—Theory, Practice, and Applications (Springer, 2021).

Education and career
Powers graduated from the University of Chicago in 1980, with a bachelor's degree in mathematics. She completed her Ph.D. in 1985 at Cornell University. Her dissertation, Finite Constructable Spaces of Signatures, was supervised by Alex F. T. W. Rosenberg.

After completing her doctorate, she joined the faculty at the University of Hawaii, but moved to Emory University only two years later, in 1987.
She was on leave from Emory as a Humboldt Fellow and Alexander von Humboldt research professor at the University of Regensburg in 1991–1992, as a visiting professor at the Complutense University of Madrid in 2002–2003, and as a program officer at the National Science Foundation in 2013–2015.

Personal
Powers is married to Colm Mulcahy, an Irish mathematician who had the same doctoral advisor.

References

External links
 
 Home page

Year of birth missing (living people)
Living people
20th-century American mathematicians
21st-century American mathematicians
American women mathematicians
Algebraic geometers
University of Chicago alumni
Cornell University alumni
University of Hawaiʻi faculty
Emory University faculty
20th-century women mathematicians
21st-century women mathematicians
20th-century American women
21st-century American women